Truncatella scalarina is a species of very small land snail that lives next to seawater, a gastropod mollusk or micromollusk in the family Truncatellidae.

Distribution and habitat
This small snail is endemic to southeastern Australia: New South Wales and Tasmania. It lives at and above the high tide level, in and under debris.

Description
The average shell length is 8 mm.

References

 Grove, S.J. (2018). A Guide to the Seashells and other Marine Molluscs of Tasmania web-site

Littorinidae
Gastropods described in 1867